Andrew Ginsburg (born October 7, 1979) is an American comedian and actor who has appeared on The Sopranos and All My Children. He is also a three-time champion bodybuilder.

Early life
Andrew Ginsburg was born on October 7, 1979, in New York, New York. Andrew attended Lawrence High School where he excelled at tennis. He later attended Boston University and it was there that he earned a degree in Psychology while also becoming a member of the men's tennis team.

Career
Andrew Ginsburg is a stand-up comedian, actor, author, and fitness expert who has performed in comedy clubs and colleges across the country.

His TV appearances include “The View,” “Saturday Night Live,” “The Sopranos,“ “All My Children,” “As The World Turns,” “The Guiding Light” and “One Life to Live.” You have also heard Andrew on Sirius/XM's “Laugh Attack,” iHeart Radio's "24/7 Comedy," “Hey, Get Off My Lawn,” and Martha Stewart Living Radio.

Ginsburg's 4th comedy album "Eat the Yolk," was recorded live at Caroline's on Broadway.  The album debuted in the Top 10 on the iTunes Comedy Chart.

His work has been published in The New York Times, New York York Post, Huffington Post, Details Magazine, Muscle and Fitness Magazine, Elle, and Glamour Magazine.

On April 18, 2017, his first book Pumping Irony: How to Build Muscle, Lose Weight, and Have the Last Laugh will be released by Skyhorse Publishing.

References

External links

1979 births
American male comedians
American male television actors
Boston University College of Arts and Sciences alumni
Living people
People from The Five Towns, New York
Lawrence High School (Cedarhurst, New York) alumni
Jewish American male comedians
Comedians from New York (state)
21st-century American comedians
21st-century American Jews